Nithya V. Raman is an American urban planner, activist, and politician serving as the Los Angeles City Councilmember for the 4th District since 2020. Raman, a member of the Democratic Party and the Democratic Socialists of America, defeated incumbent Councilmember David Ryu in 2020.

Early life and education 
Nithya Raman was born in Kerala, India, and moved to Louisiana at 6 years old. She earned a bachelor's degree in political theory from Harvard University then a master's degree in  urban planning from MIT.

Career 
After living in the United States for many years, Raman returned to her home country of India and founded the research firm Transparent Chennai. The firm's goal was to improve sanitation in the city of Chennai. Prior to entering politics, Raman founded and headed a homelessness nonprofit in Los Angeles and was the executive director of Time's Up Entertainment.

Los Angeles City Council (2020—)

Election 
Raman declared her candidacy for the Los Angeles City Council in 2019, citing the issue of homelessness as being central to her decision to run. Raman's candidacy was largely fueled by grassroots volunteers, who she claims knocked on more than 70,000 doors before the March primary. Ground Game LA, which formed following former Green Party-endorsed candidate Jessica Salans' defeat by Mitch O'Farrell in the 13th district in 2017, was credited with helping her campaign win.

Raman's platform included proposed reforms to Los Angeles' housing and homelessness policy, "a new approach to public safety," and a climate change plan that she claims will get Los Angeles to carbon neutrality by 2030. She has signed the Participatory Budget Pledge, an initiative put forward by Black Lives Matter LA which expresses a commitment to "holding a participatory budgeting process each budget cycle I hold elected office."

In the March 3, 2020 primary, Raman faced incumbent David Ryu and screenwriter Sarah Kate Levy. Ryu received 32,298 votes (44.4%), Raman received 31,502 votes (40.8%), and Sarah Kate Levy received 10,860 votes (14.1%). Because no candidate received over fifty percent of the vote, Raman and Ryu advanced to the runoff election, scheduled for November 3, 2020.

In the November 2020 runoff election, Raman defeated Ryu by a 52.87% to 47.13% margin. She will serve a four-year term as member of the City Council. Raman's victory was described as a "political earthquake" by the Los Angeles Times.

Tenure 

In April 2021, Raman proposed amendments to a draft ordinance on tenant harassment. The amendments classified cash buyout offers and threats to report false information to law enforcement as forms of harassment, and included a rent adjustment penalty, which would prevent landlords who violate the ordinance from raising a unit's rent. The ordinance was passed in June 2021.

In June 2021, Raman was served with a recall notice after only six months in office. The Los Angeles Times referred to the notice as part of a "recall fever" striking California, as at least 68 other active recalls were then ongoing in the state, including the recall of Governor Gavin Newsom. In September 2021 the recall campaign collapsed when proponents announced that they were unable to collect the required number of signatures within the allotted time.

On February 1, 2022, Raman was appointed to the board of the South Coast Air Quality Management District by Mayor of Los Angeles Eric Garcetti. She replaced councilmember Joe Buscaino. She pledged to prioritize public health and environmental justice from that position.

In 2021 and 2022, Raman was one of three councilmembers to vote against 41.18, a city ordinance that banned homeless encampments within 500 feet of schools and daycare centers. 41.18 was adopted by the City Council by a vote of 11-3, over the objections of activists who protested the measure in the Council chamber. In remarks in a City Council meeting, Raman argued that the measure "creates a district by district arms-race, where people will get pushed around from district to district instead of having a citywide strategy that prioritizes intervention in encampments by need, by safety, by fire risk, by all of the things that we are claiming to be so concerned about. In the end, this will just push people around again. It’s not going to solve homelessness or get anybody into housing."

A leaked recording between Council President Nury Martinez, Councilmembers Kevin de León and Gil Cedillo, as well as Los Angeles County Federation of Labor President Ron Herrera revealed the group's plan to use redistricting to oust Raman. Speaking of Raman, Cedillo stated that "There's certain people who don't merit us rescuing them...She's not our ally, she's not going to help us" and de León proposed to put her district "in a blender, chop it up left or right." The group planned to split the Koreatown neighborhood, a voting block for Raman, so that minority voters in her renters' district would be divided and she would face a tougher reelection. After the conversation was leaked, Raman introduced a measure to ask voters to change the city charter so that redistricting would be handled by an independent commission.

Political positions

Armenia and Artsakh 

In response to the September 2022 Armenia–Azerbaijan clashes, Raman stated "I stand with the Armenian community in Los Angeles, and with Armenians worldwide, in strongly condemning Azerbaijan’s unprovoked military attacks against civilians. I have the privilege to represent a vast, vibrant Armenian community in the Fourth District, so many of whom have welcomed me as their representative with open arms — and I deeply share in their sadness and anger.  This senseless violence must end, and I join in loudly calling for Congress to halt all military aid to Azerbaijan."

Raman has condemned Azerbaijan's 2022-2023 blockade of the Republic of Artsakh, stating that "This is not an isolated incident and is a reflection of Azerbaijan’s systematic policies that are forcing indigenous Armenians out of their ancestral homeland. Azerbaijan will continue to engage in acts of war against Artsakh and Armenia until the international community holds it responsible for its actions against the only thriving democracy in the region. We have the responsibility to ensure the safety of these peaceful nations from their hostile neighbors. I urge the Biden Administration to use all available diplomatic tools, including withholding financial support, to end the blockade."

Personal life 
Raman was born in India and emigrated to the United States with her family at the age of six.

Raman resides in the Silver Lake neighborhood of Los Angeles. She is married to television screenwriter Vali Chandrasekaran, a fellow Harvard alumnus. The two have twins: Karna and Kaveri.

Electoral history

See also 
List of Democratic Socialists of America who have held office in the United States

References 

American activists
American politicians of Indian descent
California politicians of Indian descent
American urban planners
California Democrats
California socialists
Harvard College alumni
Living people
MIT School of Architecture and Planning alumni
Democratic Socialists of America politicians from California
Los Angeles City Council members
Year of birth missing (living people)
21st-century American politicians
Indian emigrants to the United States
People from Kerala
Women from Kerala
American people of Malayali descent